Carenco is a French surname. Notable people with the surname include:

 Jean-François Carenco (born 1952), French politician
 Sophie Carenco, French scientist

See also
 Carencro, Louisiana

French-language surnames